The neolin is a modern custom variant of the violin which incorporates a fretted fingerboard, cutaway body, and tremolo mechanism based on the electric guitar.  The instrument was developed by luthier Bodo Vosshenrich, of Villemur sur Tarn, France.

External links
Official site

Experimental musical instruments